Incurvaria ploessli is a moth of the family Incurvariidae. It is found in France, Italy and possibly Switzerland.

References

External links
Lepiforum.de

Moths described in 1993
Incurvariidae
Moths of Europe